José Carlos Rodrigues Pereira (born 28 July 1952, in Santa Cruz, Madeira, Portugal) was the president of Portuguese association football club C.S. Marítimo.

A businessman by profession, Pereira took over the reins of C.S. Marítimo on 4 July 1997, when he was elected to replace the previous chairman Rui Fontes.

References

1952 births
Living people
People from Santa Cruz, Madeira
C.S. Marítimo
Portuguese football chairmen and investors